The 1st Regiment of Bengal Native Infantry refers to the Bengal Native Infantry unit that mutinied in 1857.

Chronology 
1757 formed at Calcutta as the  "Lal Pultan" (Red Battalion) ranked as 1st Battalion
1763 named Galliez Battalion after Captain Primrose Galliez
1764 Patna Mutiny
1764 ranked 9th (Galliez) Battalion
1765 posted to the 3rd Brigade
1775 became 16th Battalion
1781 became 10th Regiment of Bengal Native Infantry
1784 became 17th Regiment of Bengal Native Infantry
1786 became 17th Battalion of Bengal Native Infantry
1796 became 2nd Battalion 12th Regiment of Bengal Native Infantry
1824 became 1st Regiment of Bengal Native Infantry
1857 mutinied at Cawnpore

In 1861, after the mutiny, the title was given to the 21st Bengal Native Infantry which later became the 1st Regiment of Brahman Infantry.

References

Honourable East India Company regiments
Bengal Native Infantry